Anaru Kyle Kitchen (born 21 February 1984) is a New Zealand cricketer who plays for the Otago cricket team. He is a right-handed middle-order batsman and a slow left-arm orthodox bowler. He plays for North East Valley Cricket Club. In February 2022, Kitchen announced his retirement from domestic cricket at the end of the 2021/22 season in New Zealand.

Domestic career
He made his debut for Auckland in their list A match against Canterbury in December 2008, top scoring with 69 from 104 balls.

In June 2018, he was awarded a contract with Otago for the 2018–19 season. In June 2020, he was offered a contract by Otago ahead of the 2020–21 domestic cricket season.

International career
In December 2017, he was named in New Zealand's Twenty20 International (T20I) squad for their series against the West Indies. He made his T20I debut for New Zealand against the West Indies on 29 December 2017.

References

External links
 

1984 births
Living people
New Zealand cricketers
New Zealand Twenty20 International cricketers
Auckland cricketers
Otago cricketers